Visionaries: Knights of the Magical Light is a science fantasy media franchise that consisted of a short-lived toyline of action figures and vehicles produced by Hasbro, and an animated television series by Sunbow Productions that ran for one season of thirteen episodes in 1987. Star Comics published a bimonthly comic book series that lasted six issues from November 1987 to September 1988. The animated series was the first Hasbro property to be produced by Sunbow without the aid of Marvel Productions, and utilized Japanese studio TMS Entertainment for overseas animation work.

IDW Publishing published a five-issue crossover comic miniseries featuring the series characters and the Transformers from January to May 2018.

Overview
The story is set on the fictional planet of Prysmos, a futuristic society where all technology and complex machinery suddenly cease functioning, and its citizens are forced to rely on ancient magic to survive. This happens when the three suns of the planet align and their combined radiation emissions deactivate all technology on the planet, similar to an electromagnetic pulse effect. The titular Visionaries are knights who are split into two factions: the heroic Spectral Knights and the evil Darkling Lords. The Visionaries who wishes to gain the usage of magic is invited to a competition by the wizard Merklynn. After surviving traps, dangerous creatures, and each other, survivors are rewarded with unique animal totems affixed to their armor chestplates; these talismans are based on the bearers' individual attributes while allowing them to transform into their specific creatures.

Some of the knights are given staffs enchanted with various magic powers that are activated by its holder reciting a special verse. They could be used only once before they needed to be replenished in the animated series, but had unlimited use in the comic series. Characters who could not use these weapons instead had the power to infuse vehicles with magical powers, the spells for which were printed on official toy packaging but never used in either the comics or the animated series. In the Star Comics series, the female characters were given shields which operated in the same manner as the male characters' power staffs.

Characters

Spectral Knights
Headed by Leoric, the Spectral Knights are magic users who use magic for the purposes of good; they are the protagonists of the series.

Darkling Lords
Headed by Darkstorm, the Darkling Lords use their powers for selfish aims and are the antagonists of the series.

Other characters
Merklynn – the wizard who occupies a shrine inside Iron Mountain. Merklynn invites knights from across the land to compete in an obstacled race to his shrine, rewarding those who reach its hall with magical abilities. In exchange for recharging their power staffs, Merklynn contracts both the Darkling Lords and Spectral Knights to venture on other quests on his behalf. He sometimes offers magical devices in exchange for their services as well but Merklynn's gifts usually prove to be more trouble than they're worth. The character was named after Hasbro sculptor Bill Merklein, who developed the holography for the toyline. He is voiced by Roscoe Lee Browne.

Falkhama – a member of the same circle of wizardry as Merklynn. He is first seen in possession of an artifact called the Dragon's Eye, which Merklynn needs to replenish his magical pool. He is later used by Darkstorm in the latter's failed plot to depose Merklynn, and is then among a trio of fugitive wizards apprehended by the Spectral Knights and imprisoned by Merklynn in the Wizards' Jail. The character's name was created by Flint Dille from the surnames of then-current Marvel writers Lee Falk and Larry Hama. He is voiced by Hal Rayle.

Bogavas – an enigmatic wizard who is among the three escapees from the Wizards' Jail along with Falkhama and Wizasquizar. When the Spectral Knights capture and bring him to Merklynn, Bogavas denies knowing any real magic. Merklynn subjects him to a test to prove his honesty, which he seemingly passes and is thus allowed to go free. He is voiced by Jim Cummings.

Wizasquizar – a wizard condemned never to tell the truth. He is a fugitive from the Wizards' Jail along with Falkhama and Bogavas until the Spectral Knights capture them on Merklynn's orders. However, the Knights are then ambushed by the Darkling Lords and are forced to release Wizasquizar as a diversion. After the Darkling Lords take advantage of his curse to locate a lost underground shrine, Wizasquizar betrays them and seeks a source of power inside the shrine that would allow him to supplant Merklynn, but is thwarted by Leoric and returned by Merklynn to the Wizards' Jail. According to Dille, Wizasquizar's name was an instance of inserting "crude adolescent humor" into the show. He is voiced by Bernard Erhard.

Heskedor – an ancient crone living in an isolated cave. When Darkstorm seeks her aid in defeating Leoric, she brews him a potion that would permanently trap Leoric in his lion totem form if the spell was not broken by the time Prysmos' three suns set. The Spectral Knights manage to catch on to Darkstorm's scheme and Witterquick confronts Heskedor in her cave, forcing her to hand over an antidote that successfully changes Leoric back. She is voiced by Susan Blu.

Fletchen – a young woman from a peasant village outside New Valarak. Darkstorm uses her superstitious people as unwitting pawns in his plan to permanently trap Leoric in his lion form. Though she is able to convince his fellow Spectral Knights of the truth, the other townspeople refuse to listen and only stop attacking the Spectral Knights once Leoric is freed from the spell. Fletchen appears in one other episode thereafter, and there are hints of romantic relationship between her and Leoric. She is voiced by Jennifer Darling.

Gleering – Fletchen's father. He and his fellow villagers are fearful of all magic and lean on superstition to ward off evil. Darkstorm exploits this to turn them against the Spectral Knights by convincing them that they were "evil wizards" guarding a magical beast. Gleering and his people learned they had nothing to fear from magic, provided it was used for good. He is voiced by Peter Cullen.

Orzan – the ruler of Khemir, a city that had thrived in the Age of Science with its people relying on robotic slaves to do all their work. Despite falling into destitution after the death of technology, the Khemirites have stubbornly refused to change their way of living. Darkstorm preys on Orzan's pride and his people's desperation by using them to assist in the Darkling Lords' takeover of New Valarak. After experiencing a fearful vision of his robot slaves rebelling against him, he renounces slavery and pledges to adapt to the current times. He is voiced by Peter Cullen.

Belizar – a young Khemirite man who first alerts the Darkling Lords to his people's plight, and aids them in conquering New Valarak and enslaving the Spectral Knights. When told that, since he was not a Darkling Lord, he was ineligible to compete for the Spectral Knights' power staff, he vented his frustration on Leoric and Ectar by forcing them to move furniture and repeatedly changing his mind about where he wanted a cabinet placed. Later, however, he and his fellow Khemirite, Mana, helped the Spectral Knights escape and regain their totem powers. Belizar vowed to one day prove worthy of knighthood; in the meantime, he would stay in New Valarak and help the people rebuild. He is voiced by Jim Cummings.

Marna – a young Khemirite woman who suggests that her people begin fending for themselves after the death of technology has rendered their robotic slaves obsolete, but she is rebuked as they consider it demeaning to their culture. After taking part in Darkstorm's invasion of New Valarak, during which the Spectral Knights are captured and enslaved, Marna comes to the realization that freedom at the expense of others is wrong. She then assists in freeing the Knights and helping them drive the Darkling Lords out of New Valarak. She is voiced by Jennifer Darling.

Sun Imps
The Sun Imps are diminutive and mischievous creatures who were featured in the final episode of the animated series. They were imprisoned inside an underground tomb after causing much havoc during the first Age of Magic, but earthquakes have exposed the tomb over time, prompting Merklynn to send the Visionaries to rebury it. However, Cindarr is tricked by his fellow Darkling Lord Lexor into releasing the creatures, which leads to a frantic attempt by both factions to recapture them.

Abraxas – the Wizard Imp. Merklynn attempts to stop him with various spells, only for Abraxas to turn them back onto the caster. He is outwitted by Merklynn with a "Capture Thyself" spell that is reversed and leads to Abraxas' capture. He is voiced by Neil Ross.

Gorge – the Pig Imp. He has the ability to turn ground to mud and can also cause pigs to stampede. His weakness is gluttony, which the Visionaries later exploit by tricking him into overindulging himself. He is voiced by Peter Cullen.

Growl – the Cat Imp. He uses sonic waves to cause landslides and break windows, and can take control of feline creatures. Cindarr uses his power of Destruction to recapture him.

Knightmare – the Dream Imp. He can send people to sleep by hitting them on the head with a small hammer, and has the power of hypnosis. He is caught after being dizzied to the extent that he knocks himself out. He is voiced by Hal Rayle.

Mysto – the Fish Imp. He can turn ground to ice and take control of fish. Galadria and Virulina work together in their animal forms to trap him underwater inside a treasure chest.

Shaggy – the Hair Imp. His favourite trick is causing people's hair to grow rapidly and then tie them up with it, which he uses to humiliate Darkstorm. However, he cannot use his powers if his own hair is cut, and he is consequently converged upon with oversized shaving implements.

Action figures
In 1987 Hasbro produced a set of figures after the cartoon series ended. The figures had hologram stickers on both their chests and staffs, which resulted in their being expensive to produce. The toyline lasted one year, with figures of the twelve male characters produced along with four vehicles that were packaged with an exclusive figure. A second wave of characters was planned for release in 1988 but were never released due to the cartoon and the toyline's cancellation.

Around the 2017 San Diego Comic-Con, a new action figure of Leoric was released at the convention and later at HasbroToyShop.com in limited quantities as part of the SDCC exclusive IDW Revolution set alongside Jetfire, Roadblock, Rom the Space Knight, a Dire Wraith, characters from the Micronauts, Matt Trakker and Action Man.

TV series
In the UK, when the series was released on VHS, on five volumes, in the 80s, under the distributor ‘Video Gems’, ‘The Trail of Three Wizards’ was only broadcast and never commercially released.

Episodes

Home media
The complete thirteen-episode series was released on DVD in the United Kingdom in 2004 by Metrodome Distribution, and included a special feature of a set of PDF files of the complete scripts to each episode.

Adaptations

Comics

Marvel Comics

Marvel's Star Comics imprint published a bimonthly miniseries beginning in November 1987 that was cancelled midway through a four-part adventure in September 1988 after only six issues. The first issue was an adaptation of the first episode, "The Age of Magic Begins", but subsequent issues took the storyline in a different direction with changes from the animated series such as characters having unlimited use of their power staffs, with Witterquick and Cindarr combining the powers of their staffs to defeat an enemy in one issue. The animal totems were depicted in their natural forms instead of the two factions' representative blue or green.

IDW Publishing
IDW Publishing released a five-issue Transformers vs. Visionaries miniseries from January to May 2018, written by Magdalene Visaggio and illustrated by Fico Ossio.

Film
In December 2015, Hasbro and Paramount Pictures were planning to create a cinematic universe combining Visionaries with the G.I. Joe, Micronauts, M.A.S.K. and Rom properties. A group of writers, including Michael Chabon, Brian K. Vaughan, Nicole Perlman, and Cheo Hodari Coker, was hired to develop storylines the following year in April, but the writers' room disbanded in July 2017, and the series has since remained in development.

References

Notes

External links
 
  TheVisionaries.net
  Visionaries Online (archived)
  Syndication listing at RadioDiscussions

1980s American animated television series
1980s American science fiction television series
1980s toys
1987 American television series debuts
1987 American television series endings
1987 comics debuts
1988 comics endings
Action figures
American children's animated action television series
American children's animated science fantasy television series
American children's animated space adventure television series
American children's animated superhero television series
Anime-influenced Western animated television series
Comics based on Hasbro toys
Cultural depictions of knights
Fictional septets
First-run syndicated television programs in the United States
Hasbro brands
Post-apocalyptic animated television series
Star Comics titles
Superhero comics
Superheroes
Television about magic
Television series about shapeshifting
Television series by Claster Television
Television series by Hasbro Studios
Television series by Sunbow Entertainment
Television series created by Flint Dille
Television series set on fictional planets
Television shows based on Hasbro toys
TMS Entertainment
Fictional therianthropes